Sander Arends and Adil Shamasdin were the defending champions but chose not to defend their title.

Gerard Granollers and Fabrício Neis won the title after defeating Kimmer Coppejans and Zdeněk Kolář 6–4, 6–3 in the final.

Seeds

Draw

References

External links
 Main draw

Braga Open - Doubles
Braga